Pamplemousse may refer to:

 The Pamplemousse, a racehorse.
 Pamplemousses District, a location on Mauritius
 Pomelo, a large citrus fruit known as 'pamplemousse' in French spoken in France
 Grapefruit, a pomelo hybrid known by the name 'pamplemousse' in French spoken in Quebec, Switzerland and Belgium
 Frankie Pamplemousse, a cartoon character on The ZhuZhus
 A flavor of La Croix Sparkling Water

See also 
Pomplamoose, a musical duo
Pomplamoose (album)